Rocky Mount may refer to:

Rocky Mount, Alabama, a place in Chilton County, Alabama
Rocky Mount, Georgia
Rocky Mount, Louisiana
Rocky Mount, Miller County, Missouri
Rocky Mount, Morgan County, Missouri
Rocky Mount, North Carolina
Rocky Mount (Amtrak station)
Rocky Mount Sports Complex
Rocky Mount High School
Rocky Mount Instruments
Rocky Mount metropolitan area
Rocky Mount Mills
Rocky Mount-Wilson Regional Airport
Rocky Mount State Historic Site, Piney Flats, Tennessee
Rocky Mount, Virginia
USS Rocky Mount (AGC-3)

Events
Rocky Mount Fire of 2016, a forest fire in Shenandoah National Park